Nordre Vestfold District Court is a district court located in Horten, Norway.  It covers the municipalities of Horten, Hof, Holmestrand and Re and is subordinate Agder Court of Appeal.

References

External links 
Official site 

Defunct district courts of Norway
Organisations based in Horten